Rose Ghorayeb (born 1909 – died 2006) was a Lebanese writer, author, literary critic, and feminist. She was a professor of Arabic literature at the Lebanese American University and was frequently referred to as the "first female critic in Arabic literature". Regarded as a pioneer in aesthetic criticism, her literary career spanned more than 70 years and included many children stories, articles, biographies and plays.

Biography
Ghorayeb was born in Damour, Lebanon in 1909. In 1932, she graduated from the American Junior College for Women in Beirut, a predecessor to the Lebanese American University. In 1948, the college renamed itself the Beirut College for Women. She later became the head of the college's Arabic department.

She published extensively in many regional Arabic magazines and journals from 1943 to 1980. As a women's rights activist, she regularly wrote for the Lebanese monthly magazine The Woman's Voice. She also frequently published articles in the Voice of Bahrain, Bahrain's first magazine, and this was believed to have played a role in the introduction of new social ideas in the country.  Amongst her most notable works was a biography on the Lebanese-Palestinian poet May Ziadeh, who was regarded as a pioneer in Middle Eastern feminism in the early 20th century. From 1983 to 1993, she served as the editor of Al-Raida, the journal of the Lebanese American University's Institute for Women's Studies in the Arab World.

Works

References

1909 births
1996 deaths
Lebanese women writers
Lebanese feminists
Lebanese literary critics
Lebanese women literary critics